Eureka Streams is a free, open-source enterprise, social networking platform developed by Lockheed Martin.  Activity streams and gadgets make up its core functionality.  Content within Eureka Streams consists primarily of microblogs and internal and external web feeds. Users typically provide links to other content, such as wikis, blogs and shared documents housed in a content management system.

Technical architecture
Eureka Streams uses a shared nothing architecture.  It uses Memcached, Apache Maven, PostgreSQL and Hibernate. It uses Shindig for OpenSocial.

It makes use of Java Message Service (JMS), Java Persistence API (JPA), Lucene and Google Web Toolkit (GWT). It makes use of the Apache JServ Protocol (AJP), OAuth and Representational State Transfer (REST).

History
The development of the Eureka Streams software began at Lockheed Martin in early 2009.  The open source project was first announced publicly at the Enterprise 2.0 Conference in Boston, Massachusetts in July 2009.  However, the name "Eureka Streams" was chosen later that summer and subsequently revealed publicly with the open source project announcement on July 26, 2010.

The core team behind Eureka Streams resides in the CIO Office of Lockheed Martin Information Systems & Global Solutions.  Its principal members include Shawn Dahlen, Chris Keohane, Brian H. Mayo, Steve Terlecki, Blake Caldwell, Chad Scott, Rob Keane, and Anthony Romano.

When the open source project was first announced, the open source community initially reacted with some surprise.  This is partly because the originating company is a large aerospace & defense company.  In addition, the project apparently bucked the trend of fewer enterprises participating in open source projects.

Features
Eureka Streams consists of three end-user components: Activity Streams, Profiles, and Start Page.  It also provides governance-related features.

Activity streams
 Create and follow individual or group streams
 Create public or private group streams
 Post message or links
 Comment on and share activity
 Save an activity as a favorite
 Import activity to an individual or group stream (e.g., from any public RSS feed)
 Organize streams into custom lists
 Save a keyword search for activity
 Create an app from a list or saved search
 Restrict the posting of messages or comments to a stream
 Receive email notifications for new activity, comments, and followers
 Receive real-time alerts for new activity when viewing a stream

Profiles
 Capture profile information for an individual including a biography, work history, education, and interests
 Capture profile information for a group or organization including an overview and keywords
 Upload an avatar for an individual, group, or organization stream
 Upload a page banner for a group or organization stream
 View the connections for an individual or group stream
 View a checklist of items to complete a profile
 Browse profiles of individual, group, and organization streams sorted by new, active, or popular
 Search for individuals, groups, and organizations based on profile information

Start page
 Add apps that display information from intranet and Internet sources
 Organize apps onto tabs
 Move apps on or between tabs via drag-and-drop
 Apply a layout to a tab
 Browse or search a gallery of apps and themes
 View any public RSS feed in a feed reader app and share items to a personal stream

Governance
 Manage an access list based on LDAP groups and attributes
 Embed videos for end users
 Manage gadgets, themes, and stream plugins
 Configure terms of service confirmation
 Display message to users about appropriate use
 Set a duration for activity expiration
 Manage the creation of new groups
 Manage activity flagged by users as inappropriate

See also

 List of social networking websites
 Social software

References

External links
 
 
 Groups.google.com

Professional networks
2010 software
Free business software
Free software programmed in Java (programming language)
Cross-platform free software
Lockheed Martin
American political websites